Joe Connelly is an American writer, best known for his first novel, Bringing Out the Dead, which was made into an eponymous film. A native of New York City, he now lives in the Adirondacks with his wife and family.

Biography 
Connelly was born in St Clare’s Hospital in Hell's Kitchen, where his mother worked and where she had met his father years before (at a dance in the basement). They were working-class, and he was raised in Warwick, New York. Having secured a scholarship to become the first member of his family to go to college, after three years he dropped out of Colgate University and, before publishing his first novel, worked as a paramedic for nine years, back at St. Clare's. He wrote in his spare time over that period, in a small flat in the Upper West Side and while living in Ireland and travelling in Eastern Europe for a considerable period.  During this time, Connelly was encouraged by a creative writing professor at Columbia University.

Bringing Out the Dead (1998) is autobiographical in nature and follows the story of a paranoid, hollow-eyed paramedic who works the graveyard shift in 
Hell's Kitchen, the barrio bounding the phantasmagoria of Times Square. Having seen so much human suffering on the job, the main character of the book, Frank, has turned inwards, despondent to the point of becoming a drunk, his life a living hell. The novel was an immediate bestseller on publication, and was optioned for $100,000, eventually making its way to production as a major motion picture of the same name in 1999. Bringing Out the Dead was directed by Martin Scorsese and the screenplay was adapted by Paul Schrader. Though the film was a critical success, it fell short of box office expectations.

His second novel, Crumbtown (2003), didn't sell as well as the first. Although the book's characters were the trademark down-and-out personalities of Connelly's debut novel, he was criticized for relying on well-trodden clichés.

References 

20th-century American novelists
Year of birth missing (living people)
Living people
People from Warwick, New York
Colgate University alumni
21st-century American novelists
Novelists from New York (state)
American male novelists
20th-century American male writers
21st-century American male writers
American expatriates in Ireland